The following lists events that happened during 2010 in Bosnia and Herzegovina.

Incumbents
Presidency:
Haris Silajdžić (until November 10), Bakir Izetbegović (starting November 10)
Željko Komšić 
Nebojša Radmanović
Prime Minister: Nikola Špirić

Events

March
 March 1 - 63-year-old former President of the Federation of Bosnia and Herzegovina Ejup Ganić is detained at London Heathrow Airport while trying to leave the UK to escape charges of war crimes.
 March 11 - Ejup Ganić is released on bail on "stringent" conditions by the British High Court.

April
 April 21 - Bosnian police fired tear gas and water at war veterans in Sarajevo, during a protest against proposed state benefit cuts.
 April 22 - NATO foreign ministers agree to launch a Membership Action Plan for Bosnia and Herzegovina.

August
 August 11 - Corpses of more than 50 people are unearthed in Perućac lake on the border between Bosnia and Herzegovina and Serbia by investigators looking for people who were killed during the Bosnian War.

October
 October 12 - 2010 Bosnian general election took place.

References

 
Years of the 21st century in Bosnia and Herzegovina
2010s in Bosnia and Herzegovina
Bosnia and Herzegovina
Bosnia and Herzegovina